The Ludington family was an American family active in the fields of business, banking, and politics. Henry Ludington was active in the American Revolution, while Lewis, James, Nelson, and Harrison Ludington were involved in developing cities in the states of New York, Wisconsin, and Michigan. Harrison was a governor of Wisconsin.

Origins 
Author La Reiana Rule says the American name Ludington is of English origin from Luddington. She believes ancestors of the American Ludingtons were in towns in England from the 10th century. Her research indicates the name "Leodingtun" signifies "estate of the compatriot's family".

Journalist Willis Fletcher Johnson says the American surname Ludington is also spelled Luddington, Ludinton, and Ludenton. He was told this family originated from the 16th-century Ludingtons of Shrawley and Worcester in England. Tradition has it that a Ludington was a follower of Richard the Lionheart in the Third Crusade and helped him plan a prison escape. This Ludington soldier received nobility status and a family coat of arms for his efforts. The coat of arms is colored in argent, azure, and gules, and emblazoned with a lion passant guardant and a crest featuring a palmer's staff. The motto reads:  (Honor not penitence).

Historiography 
According to Paula Hunt, writing in The New England Quarterly in 2015, Johnson's Colonel Henry Ludington: A Memoir was published privately by Ludington's grandchildren, Charles H. and Lavinia Elizabeth Ludington. The biography, according to Hunt, "offers a laudatory account" of the colonel's life; Hunt states that it "was certainly not of the order of Johnson’s usual projects", noting that it was omitted from his New York Times obituary. She writes that the New England Historical & Genealogical Register reviewed it as a "charming, simple memoir", which she says was intended to "remedy a belief that the Revolution-era militia and its officers had not received the recognition they deserved and to ensure the colonel's place in American history", citing page vii of the Memoirs. She characterized the work as a "not wholly reliable source".

Doubts about the family's accounts had been raised before Hunt's report, and as early as 1956.

Genealogy

William Ludington 
William Luddington and his wife Ellen are of unknown English origin, but are considered the base foundation of the American Ludingtons since there are confirmed history records on them. They were married about 1636. They immigrated to America about 1639 and settled in Charlestown, Massachusetts, which later became Malden, Massachusetts. Court records of 1640 show that William built his residence outside the city limits, which was illegal, and was issued a high fine for the infraction. The fine was rescinded because about this same time the law was repealed. William and Ellen raised seven children (the first born in England). After raising their children they moved to New Haven, Connecticut, around 1660, where William died shortly thereafter, as his widow remarried on May 5, 1663, to John Rose. William's will was probated May 25, 1663.

Thomas was their first child, born in 1637. John was born in 1640. Their third child was Mary, born 1642–1643. Their fourth child was Henry, who was killed in King Philip's War. Their fifth child was Hannah. Their sixth child was William II, born about 1655 who had two wives. William and Ellen's seventh child was Matthew, who died as a baby within 30 days.

William II was a businessman and married twice. His first wife was Martha Rose, daughter of John Rose and granddaughter of Robert Rose. Their children were: Henry, born 1679; Eleanor, birth date unknown (circa 1683) and married in 1714. His second wife was Mercy Whitehead and their children were: twins Mary and Mercy, born 1691; Hannah, born 1693; John, born 1694; Eliphalet, born 1697; Elizabeth, born 1699; Dorothy, born 1702; and Doreas, born 1704.

The second son of Henry (b. 1679) was William III, born at Branford, Connecticut on September 6, 1702. He married Mary Knowles, of Branford, Connecticut, on November 5, 1730. They had eight children, Submit, Mary, Henry, Lydia, Samuel, Rebecca, Anne, and Stephen. Mary Knowles died on April 16, 1759 and William III married his second wife, Mary Wilkinson on April 17, 1760.

Henry Ludington II 

Henry Ludington was the third child of William III and Mary (Knowles) Ludington. He was born at Branford, Connecticut, on May 25, 1739. He built his home and a grist mill around 1775 in the area known as the hamlet of Ludingtonville; this later became the town of Kent, Putnam County, New York. He was made Colonel during the American Revolution and was aide-de-camp to George Washington.

Sybil Ludington 

Sybil Ludington was the first child of Henry Ludington II and his wife Abigail Ludington. Sybil has received widespread recognition as the female Paul Revere; a report in The New England Quarterly says there is little evidence backing the story, and whether the ride occurred is questioned by modern scholars. In 1777, at the age of 16, she is said to have ridden a horse  through the night to warn militiamen under the direction of her father that British troops had attacked Danbury, Connecticut.

Frederick Ludington sons 

Harrison Ludington and Nelson Ludington were sons of Frederick, and Colonel Ludington was their grandfather. Harrison is identified with the development of the city of Milwaukee. He served as a Governor of Wisconsin from 1876 to 1878.

Nelson established a sawmill and laid out the city of Escanaba, Michigan, in 1862 and provided the name for the city. Escanaba street names were originally named after the wives and daughters of the partners of the Nelson Ludington Company.

Lewis Ludington 

Lewis Ludington was the twelfth child and sixth son of Henry Ludington II. Lewis was the youngest of the children, born June 25, 1786. He helped develop Columbus, Wisconsin.

James Ludington 

James Ludington, the sixth son of Lewis, never lived in Ludington, Michigan, a town named in his honor. Many of the street names of Ludington, Michigan, are related to James in one way or another. The main downtown intersection is James Street and Ludington Ave.

Ludington family tree

References

Sources

Further reading

External links
 Ludington history lives in Oak Park - Ludington heirlooms

 
American families of English ancestry
Business families of the United States
Political families of the United States
Families from Massachusetts
Families from Michigan
Families from New York (state)
Families from Wisconsin